Xaver may refer to:

 Cyclone Berit (2011)
 Cyclone Bodil (2013)